David Healy is a retired footballer, who represented the Northern Ireland national football team between 2000 and 2013. During his international career, he played 95 matches in which he scored 36 goals, becoming his country's top scorer. Healy made his international debut in a friendly against Luxembourg at the Stade Josy Barthel in February 2000, scoring two goals in a 3–1 victory. In June 2004, he became Northern Ireland's all-time top scorer, after netting his 14th international goal in a friendly against Trinidad and Tobago; the previous record of 13 goals was held jointly by Billy Gillespie and Colin Clarke. As of October 2015, Kyle Lafferty is second to Healy in Northern Ireland's all-time scoring record, with 16 goals. Healy's final goal came in 2012, after a four-year goal drought, when he scored a 95th-minute equaliser against Azerbaijan during the 2014 FIFA World Cup qualification.

Healy is the only Northern Ireland player to have scored two international hat-tricks. Both were achieved during UEFA Euro 2008 qualification matches: the first came in a 3–2 win against Spain in September 2006, and the second in a 4–1 away defeat of Liechtenstein, six months later. Overall, Healy scored 13 goals during that qualification campaign, making him the highest-scoring player in a single European Championship qualification tournament. As a result of this record, he was presented with a special award by Michel Platini on behalf of UEFA. Healy held the record alone until October 2015, when Poland's Robert Lewandowski scored against the Republic of Ireland during qualification for UEFA Euro 2016 and matched Healy's feat.

During Healy's career, Northern Ireland failed to qualify for either the FIFA World Cup or UEFA European Championship finals; the majority of his goals came in qualification matches (22), as opposed to friendlies. Healy has scored more goals (five) against Liechtenstein than any other nation, and more than half of his goals (20) were scored at Windsor Park in Belfast. Upon retirement, he was described by national team manager Michael O'Neill as "an iconic player".

List of international goals
Home team goals listed first. Northern Ireland score listed first, score column indicates score after each Healy goal.

Statistics

References

Northern Ireland national football team
Healy, David